Charles Orin Cunningham (October 24, 1872 – January 8, 1942) was a provincial politician from Alberta, Canada. He served as a member of the Legislative Assembly of Alberta from 1917 to 1921, sitting with the Conservative caucus in opposition.

Political career
Cunningham ran for a seat to the Alberta Legislature in the 1917 Alberta general election as a Conservative candidate in the Ponoka electoral district. He won a straight fight over Liberal incumbent William Campbell to pick up the district for his party. The race was hotly contested with Cunningham finishing ahead of Campbell by 31 votes.

Cunnhingham did not seek a second term in office and retired at dissolution of the assembly in 1921.

References

External links
Legislative Assembly of Alberta Members Listing

Progressive Conservative Association of Alberta MLAs
1872 births
1942 deaths